The following is a list of squads for each national team that competed at the 2019 UEFA European Under-17 Championship in Republic of Ireland. Each national team had to submit a squad of 20 players born on or after 1 January 2002.

All ages are as of 2 May 2019, the day before the start of tournament.

Group A

Belgium 
Head coach:  Bob Browaeys

Czech Republic
Head coach:  Václav Kotal

Greece
Head coach:  Nikolaos Kechagias

Republic of Ireland 
Head coach:  Colin O'Brien

Group B

England
Head coach:  Steve Cooper

France
Head coach:  Jean-Claude Giuntini

Netherlands
Head coach:  Peter van der Veen

Sweden 
Head coach:  Christofer Augustsson

Group C

Hungary
Head coach:  Sándor Preisinger

Iceland
Head coach:  Davíð Snorri Jónasson

Portugal
Head coach:  Emílio Peixe

Russia 
Head coach:  Dmitri Khomukha

Group D

Austria 
Head coach:  Manfred Zsak

Germany
Head coach:  Michael Feichtenbeiner

Italy
Head coach:  Carmine Nunziata

Spain
Head coach:  David Gordo

References

External links
Squads on UEFA.com

UEFA European Under-17 Championship squads
2019 UEFA European Under-17 Championship